Religion in Nepal encompasses a wide diversity of groups and beliefs. Nepal is a secular nation and secularism in Nepal under the interim constitution (Part 1, Article 4) is defined as 'religious, cultural freedom, along with the protection of religion, culture handed down from time immemorial that is "the state government is bound for protecting and fostering Hindu religion" while maintaining "religious" and "cultural" freedom throughout the nation as fundamental rights. Nepal's most widely practiced religions are Hinduism and Buddhism, which (as of 2011) account for 81.3% and 9.04% of the national population respectively. According to a survey, Nepal is the most religious Hindu-majority country in the world, with most of the important Hindu pilgrimage centers concentrated in this country. Nepal is also the birthplace of Siddhartha Gautama (The Buddha), because of which Buddhism has a very special place in the country and is often intertwined with Hinduism among some communities. Nepal is a multi-cultural, multi-ethnic, multi-lingual and multi-religious nation through democracy. Shiva is widely regarded as the guardian deity of Nepal. Nepal is home to the world-famous Pashupatinath Temple, a UNESCO World Heritage Site where Hindus from around the world come for pilgrimage purposes. According to Hindu Itihasa, the goddess Sita of the epic Ramayana was born in the Mithila Kingdom of King Janaka Raja. The national animal of Nepal is the cow, which is considered a sacred animal in Hinduism. Because of this, the slaughter of cows is illegal in Nepal.

Freedom of religion is also guaranteed by the Nepali constitution. Forced conversion from Hinduism to other religions is prohibited by law, especially when money is used as a direct or indirect inducement to convert, but anyone can convert from one religion to another as an exercise of their own volition. Nationalists have sometimes protested against secularism – they want Nepal to become a Hindu Democratic state. Prior to the movement for democracy in early 2006 and the sacking of King Gyanendra in 2008, the country was officially a Hindu kingdom, and the constitution still protects and fosters the Hindu religion. Recently, Nepal's senior minister have advocated for declaring Nepal a Hindu state constitutionally. Hinduism is the majority religion in Nepal, and profoundly influences its social structure and politics, while Buddhism (Tibetan Buddhism) is practiced by some ethnic groups (such as the Newar people) in forms which are strongly influenced by Hinduism. Kiratism is the indigenous religion of the population belonging to the Kirati ethnicity. Small populations, especially in eastern Nepal, adhere to Islam, Christianity, Sikhism, Jainism, Bön, and the Bahá’í Faith.

History

Hinduism and Buddhism have been present in Nepal since the beginning of recorded history in the area. Islam was introduced to the nation around the 11th century with the arrival of Muslim invaders. Sikhism came to Nepal during the 18th century and spread throughout Nepal, and Jainism came to Nepal during the 19th century but spread only to Kathmandu and some districts of Nepal.

Religious tolerance can be found in royal orders dated Falgun Sudi 12, 1884 V.S. issued by the Hindu Shah monarch Rajendra Bikram Shah under the premiership of Bhimsen Thapa to Buddhist monks in the Kingdom of Nepal:

According to the 2011 census, 81.3% of the Nepalese population is Hindu, 9.0% are Buddhist, 4.4% are Muslim, 3.0% are Kiratist (indigenous ethnic religion), 1.4% are Christian, 0.1% are Sikhs, 0.1% are Jains and 0.7% follow other religions or no religion. This varies from the 2001 census, where 80.62% percent of Nepalese were Hindu, 10.74% were Buddhist, 4.20% Muslim, 3.60% Kirant (an indigenous religion), 0.45% Christian, and 0.4% were classified as other groups such as Bön. In 1971 Hindus were 89.4% of the population, Buddhists 7.5%, and Kirants statistically 0%. However, statistics on religious groups are complicated by the ubiquity of dual-faith practices, particularly among Hindus and Buddhists.

The geographical distribution of religious groups in the early 1990s revealed a preponderance of Hindus, accounting for at least 87% of the population in every region. The largest concentrations of Buddhists were found in the eastern hills, the Kathmandu Valley, and the central Tarai; in each area about 10% of the people were Buddhist. Buddhism was more common among the Newar and Tibeto-Nepalese groups. Among the Tibeto-Nepalese, those most influenced by Hinduism were the Magar, Sunuwar, and Rai peoples. Hindu influence was less prominent among the Gurung, Limbu, Bhote, Tamang, and Thakali groups, who continued to employ Buddhist monks for their religious ceremonies. Since Hinduism and Buddhism are both Dharmic religions, they usually accept each other's practices and many people practice a combination of both. In 2015, a new constitution was adopted and equal rights were granted to all religions in Nepal. However, influencing others to change their religion is prohibited. 

Nepal's constitution does not give anyone the right to evangelise or convert any person to another religion. Nepal also passed a more stringent anti-conversion law in 2017.

Secularism

Nepal was declared as a 'secular state' in 2008 after the success of the people's movement of 2006 that saw the abolition of monarchy and formation of democracy as a criterion for running the nation on the path of equality, fraternity, freedom, justice and liberty.

The five main provisions of Secularism in Nepal are as follows:

1) A clause stating that "Religious and cultural freedom, with the protection of religion and culture practiced since ancient times". This has been questioned by some people who say that it indirectly favours "Hinduism" as a state-sponsored religion.

2) Proselytising remains illegal.

3) Critics says that the constitution discriminates against women in terms of passing on citizenship rights and the citizenship policy was hotly debated during the drafting of the constitution.

4) The state and the judiciary are prohibited from discriminating against sexual and gender minorities. The constitution is the first in Asia to specifically protect the rights of lesbian, gay, bisexual and transgender communities.

5) The rhododendron is the national flower, and the cow, which is a holy animal in Hinduism, is the national animal.

Demographics

Hinduism in Nepalese culture

According to Nepalese theology, Brahma, Vishnu and Shiva came to Nepal in the form of deer.

Establishment of Nepal by Ne Muni
King Muni used to perform religious ceremonies at Teku, the confluence of the Bagmati and Bishnumati rivers. He selected Bhuktaman to be the first king in the line of the Gopal (Cowherd) Dynasty. The Gopal dynasty ruled for 300 years. Yakshya Yadav was the last king of this dynasty. The Kirat Dynasty ruled for 550–800 years. The first king of Kirat Yalambar and Gasti was the last king of this dynasty. The Licchavi dynasty ruled for 200–350 years. The Malla dynasty ruled for 400–600 years. The Shah dynasty ruled for 300 years.

Flag of Nepal
The current flag of Nepal was established in 1962 and depicts a white moon and crescent shape emitting eight rays above a white sun emitting 12 rays.

See also

 Buddhism in Nepal
 Newar Buddhism
 Banishment of Buddhist monks from Nepal
 Hinduism in Nepal
 Newar Hinduism
 Gurung shamanism
 Islam in Nepal
 Nepali Muslims
 Judaism in Nepal
 Christianity in Nepal
Roman Catholicism in Nepal
 Jainism in Nepal
 Bahá'í Faith in Nepal
 Sikhism in Nepal
 Irreligion in Nepal

References

Sources